Maharani Shashank Manjari Devi Sahiba was an Indian politician. She was elected to the Lok Sabha, lower house of the Parliament of India from Palamu, Bihar as a member of the Swatantra Party. She belonged to the erstwhile royal family (Narain Raj Parivar) of Ramgarh Raj  and was also the grand-daughter of H.H. Maharaja Shri Raja Arjun Singh of Porahat. She was married to Maharaja Lakshmi Narain Singh Bahadur of Ramgarh Raj. She was also a M.L.A. from Jaridhi Vidhan Sabha and Dumri Vidhan Sabha for three terms and was also the irrigation minister of Bihar during 1969. She was regarded as one of the most powerful women of India as she never lost a singh election in her entire life.

References

External links
 Official biographical sketch in Parliament of India website

Swatantra Party politicians
Lok Sabha members from Bihar
India MPs 1962–1967
1899 births
Date of death missing
Women members of the Lok Sabha
People from Palamu district
Members of the Bihar Legislative Assembly
20th-century Indian women
20th-century Indian people